Gamarnik, Hamarnik, or Hamarnyk (Ukrainian: Гамарник) is a Jewish and Ukrainian surname that may refer to the following notable people:

Andrea Gamarnik (born 1964), Argentine molecular virologist
Grigory Gamarnik (1929–2018), Soviet wrestler
Yan Gamarnik (1894–1937), Soviet politician

See also
 

Ukrainian-language surnames